The Fairey Fawn was a British single-engine light bomber of the 1920s. It was designed as a replacement for the Airco DH.9A and served with the Royal Air Force between 1924 and 1929.

Development
   
The Fairey Fawn was designed by F Duncanson of Fairey Aviation as a replacement for the Airco DH.9A in the light day-bomber role, to meet the requirements of Specification 5/21 for an aircraft for reconnaissance and army cooperation duties. It was a development of the Fairey Pintail floatplane, powered by a Napier Lion engine.

The first of three prototypes flew on 8 March 1923. The second and third prototypes were fitted with lengthened fuselages to improve stability, and this was adapted for the production version. The Fawn was fitted with fuel tanks above the top wing in order to meet Air Ministry safety requirements. These tanks posed a hazard to the pilots if the aircraft overturned on landing.
 
A revised specification 20/23 was issued which added the bomber role. Two prototypes and 48 production Fawn Mk II aircraft were ordered against the new specification in August 1923 to re-equip the home based DH.9A squadrons of the RAF, although the first two production aircraft were completed as short fuselage Fawn Mk Is. The remainder of this order were full production long fuselage Fawn Mk IIs. The Fawn Mk III was fitted with a more powerful 468 hp (350 kW) Lion V engine, while the Fawn Mk IV was fitted with a supercharged Lion VI engine.

Operational history
The Fawn entered service with 12 Squadron in March 1924, equipping two further regular squadrons, 11 Squadron and 100 Squadron. Despite the fact that the Fawn was originally intended to replace all the home-based DH.9A squadrons, four more squadrons continued to be equipped with the DH.9A for several more years before being replaced by other types.

The Fawn was not a popular aircraft in RAF service, having little better performance than the aircraft it replaced, and having a poor view for the pilot owing to the bulky Lion engine.

In 1926 the Fawn was replaced in the three regular squadrons by the Hawker Horsley and the Fairey Fox. The aircraft freed up were used to equip two Special Reserve and Auxiliary Air Force squadrons, these remaining in service until 1929.

Variants
Fawn Mk I
J6907 Prototype Short fuselage – 450 hp (340 kW) Lion II engine, later converted to Mk III
J6908 Prototype built with Long Fuselage 
J6909 Prototype built with Long Fuselage
Two further Mk I aircraft were built as part of the main Mk II production batch.
Fawn Mk II
J6990 Prototype to Specification 20/23 ordered in February 1923
J6991 Prototype to Specification 20/23 ordered in February 1923
Long Fuselage – 450 hp (340 kW) Lion II engine. Main production type – 48 production aircraft built.
Fawn Mk III
468 hp (349 kW) Lion V engine. 20 built.
Fawn Mk IV
Twelve Mk IIIs were converted with supercharged Lion VI engines for a proposed Mk IV variant but the trial was abandoned and the Mk Iv designation was not used.

Operators

Royal Air Force
No. 11 Squadron RAF – April 1924 – May 1927
No. 12 Squadron RAF – May 1924 – December 1926
No. 100 Squadron RAF – May 1924 – December 1926
No 503 (County of Lincoln) Squadron RAF Special Reserve – October 1926 – June 1929
No 602 (City of Glasgow) Squadron RAF Auxiliary Air Force – September 1927 – October 1929

Specifications (Fawn Mk III)

See also

References

1920s British bomber aircraft
Fawn
Biplanes
Single-engined tractor aircraft
Aircraft first flown in 1923